Steven Universe is an American animated television series created by Rebecca Sugar for Cartoon Network. It tells the coming-of-age story of a young boy, Steven Universe (Zach Callison), who lives with the Crystal Gems—magical, mineral-based aliens named Garnet (Estelle), Amethyst (Michaela Dietz), and Pearl (Deedee Magno Hall)—in the fictional town of Beach City. Steven, who is half-Gem, has adventures with his friends and helps the Gems protect the world from their own kind. The pilot was first shown in May 2013, and the series ran for five seasons, from November 2013 to January 2019. The TV film Steven Universe: The Movie was released in September 2019, and an epilogue limited series, Steven Universe Future, ran from December 2019 to March 2020.

The themes of the series include love, family, and the importance of healthy interpersonal relationships. Sugar based the lead character on her younger brother Steven, who was an artist for the series. She developed Steven Universe while she was a writer and storyboard artist on Adventure Time, which she left when Cartoon Network commissioned her series for full production. The series is storyboard-driven; the show's storyboard artists were responsible for writing the dialogue and creating the action in addition to drawing the storyboards. Books, comics and video games based on the series have been released.

The series has developed a broad fanbase and has been critically acclaimed for its design, music, voice acting, characterization, prominence of LGBTQ themes and science fantasy worldbuilding. The series won a GLAAD Media Award for Outstanding Kids & Family Program in 2019, becoming the first animated series to win the award. It also received a Peabody Award for Children's & Youth Programming in 2019. It was nominated for five Emmy Awards and five Annie Awards.

Synopsis
Steven Universe is set in the fictional town of Beach City, Delmarva, where the Crystal Gems live in an ancient beachside temple and protect humanity from monsters and other threats. The Gems are ageless alien warriors who project female humanoid forms from magical gemstones at the core of their being. The Crystal Gems comprise Garnet, Amethyst, Pearl and Steven—a young, half-human, half-Gem boy who inherited his gemstone from his mother, the Crystal Gems' former leader Rose Quartz. As Steven tries to understand his gradually expanding range of powers, he spends his days accompanying the Gems on their missions, as well as interacting with his father Greg, his best friend Connie, his magical pet lion, and the other residents of Beach City. He explores the abilities inherited from his mother, which include fusion—the ability of Gems to merge their bodies and abilities to form new, more powerful personalities.

The series' first season gradually reveals that the Crystal Gems are fugitives from a great interstellar empire. During their missions they visit ruins that were once important to Gem culture but have been derelict for millennia. The Gems are cut off from the Gem homeworld, and Steven learns that many of the monsters and artifacts they encounter are Gems who were corrupted by a Gem weapon of mass destruction and can no longer maintain rational, humanoid form. By the end of the first season, Steven learns that, millennia ago, the Gem empire intended to sterilize the Earth to incubate new Gems, but Rose Quartz led her supporters, the Crystal Gems, in a violent and apparently successful rebellion against this genocidal plan. The discovery and release of Lapis Lazuli, a Gem trapped on Earth for millennia, puts the Crystal Gems at risk from the Gem empire once more, leading to the arrival of hostile envoys Peridot and Jasper.

In the second season, Peridot allies with and eventually joins the Crystal Gems to prevent Earth's destruction by a Gem "geo-weapon" buried in the planet. During the third season, Lapis Lazuli decides to live on Earth with Peridot; Jasper is defeated and captured; and Steven learns that his mother assassinated one of the Gem empire's matriarchs, Pink Diamond. In the fourth season, as Steven wrestles with his conflicted feelings about his mother's actions, the Gem empire leaders Blue Diamond and Yellow Diamond begin to turn their full attention to Earth. In the fifth and final season, Steven learns that in fact his mother was Pink Diamond, who faked her death to assume the identity of Rose Quartz; he uses this revelation to persuade the other Diamonds to try to take responsibility for and fix the damage they have caused.

Conception

In 2011, after former Cartoon Network vice-president of comedy animation Curtis Lelash asked the staff for ideas for a new series, Rebecca Sugar—an artist working for the network's series Adventure Time—described her initial ideas for what would become Steven Universe, and the project was chosen for development. While developing her show, Sugar continued working on Adventure Time. The series evolved from a short story written by Sugar entitled "Ballad of Margo and Dread", about a sensitive child helping teenagers with problems they cannot verbalize.

Cartoon Network executives commissioned the show after the crew's art presentation, and Sugar became the first non-binary person to create a show independently for the network. Prior to coming out as non-binary, she was described as the first woman to do so. Before a production team had been appointed, Sugar tried to alter elements of the show's plot and developed the character's identity so her crew would have the freedom she did when she worked for Adventure Time.

Development 
When Sugar's show was commissioned, she resigned from her role as a storyboard artist on Adventure Time to focus on her own series. Sugar focused the pilot short on the main characters and their personalities to demonstrate the series' humor. The pilot is a slice-of-life episode that does not involve major events because the series' world was still in development. Sugar and her production team focused the plot on interaction between the Crystal Gems and Steven. Sugar strove to make her pilot distinctive in terms of its artistic and aesthetic detail but was hampered by the time limit imposed upon her by Cartoon Network. The problems with the pilot helped Sugar develop the show's concept; she said, "to know that there is so much more that you can't see and the way that knowledge frustrates and excites and confuses and scares you".

The title character Steven is loosely based on Steven Sugar, Rebecca's younger brother. During Steven Universe development, Sugar repeatedly asked her brother whether naming the show after him was a good idea; she stopped asking when it was commissioned. Her brother had no problem with it and trusted Sugar to use his name wisely. In an interview with the New York Times, Sugar discussed developing the background of the show's protagonist, saying she wanted to base the character's viewpoint on her brother growing up "where you're so comfortable in your life because you get all the attention, but you also want to rise up and not be the little brother".

When the original pilot was presented to Cartoon Network executives, they told the crew the series would air in 2013. Cartoon Network released the original pilot in May 2013. Sugar and her team panicked because the series was going to be very different from the pilot episode. The pilot was popular when it was released, engendering forum discussions in which people expressed their hopes of seeing it on the air soon. Those who knew Rebecca Sugar from Adventure Time were also interested. Positive reaction to the show reassured its crew.

To prepare for the show's commissioning by Cartoon Network, Sugar began assembling a production crew. Jackie Buscarino was engaged as a producer in September 2012 and was tasked with hiring people and supervising the show's crew. During this period of development, Sugar and her team were moved to a building behind the main Cartoon Network studio and based on the same floor as the crew of The Powerpuff Girls CGI special. Some artists who had worked on the special, such as colorist Tiffany Ford and art directors Kevin Dart, Ellie Michalka and Jasmin Lai, were later invited to join the Steven Universe team. Cartoon Network also provided Sugar with a list of suggested writers; when she saw Ben Levin and Matt Burnett (former writers for Level Up) on the list she immediately asked them to join her team because she was familiar with their work. Freelance artist Danny Hynes, whom the former supervising director Ian Jones-Quartey knew from his own project Lakewood Plaza Turbo, became the show's lead character designer. Steven Sugar was assigned as the background designer after his work on the original pilot, and was assisted by Dart, Michalka, Lai, background painter Amanda Winterston and others.

During the art presentation, Jones-Quartey, Guy, Hynes and Steven Sugar created artwork that differed from their previous work. Jones-Quartey wanted to work with something new, retaining elements of the show's previous project. He worked with Elle Michalka, who later took over his role as background painter for the presentation, to create concept art for an "action-comedy" series. Around this time, Jones-Quartey added stars to the series' logo because he saw them as a versatile symbol. He later said he over-used them, and they were criticized at the art presentation. The art presentation's drawings were by Rebecca Sugar, Jones-Quartey, Hynes, Paul Villeco (a writer and storyboard artist) and Steven Sugar. Michalka did the painting.

Design 
During the development of the Steven Universe pilot, Sugar focused much attention on the design of the world, adding notes to her drawings. Inspired by the idea of foreign figures (Gems) living human lives, she drew many sketches depicting their world and history. The series' design was also inspired by her and her brother's interest in video games, comics and animation. After the series was commissioned, Sugar decided to redesign everything to make the series "flexible and simple" for future production staff to add ideas of their own. During this time, the art director was Kevin Dart, followed by Jasmin Lai, Elle Michalka, and Ricky Cometa. Dart's artistic style has remained a great influence on the show long after his departure. Steven Sugar praised Dart's work and was inspired by him in college years, saying Dart had more ideas for the art than he did.

In the pilot, only two locations appeared (the Temple and the Big Donut). The Temple was designed by Ian Jones-Quartey, Steven Sugar, Ben Levin, Matt Burnett, Tom Herpich and Andy Ristaino. The Temple's dual faces were based on Guy Davis' ideas. Steven Sugar designed the rest of Beach City for the series; he was painstaking in his attention to detail. Sugar also designed people, houses, cars, buildings and restaurants. Because of Rebecca Sugar's redesigned drawings, the two original locations had to be redrawn.

To find inspiration for the show's backgrounds, the Sugars and Jones-Quartey went to their favorite beaches. The series' setting, Beach City, is loosely based on Delaware beaches Rehoboth Beach, Bethany Beach and Dewey Beach, all of which Rebecca Sugar visited as a child. Steven Sugar drew Beach City with a boardwalk lined with a variety of shops. He wanted it to have a "specific style" so viewers could believe it was based on a real location; he drew the roads and shops consistently oriented with the Temple and a water tower. The concept for the primary setting was inspired by Akira Toriyama's Dr. Slump, which features a small environment in which the recurring characters live where they work. Steven Sugar made the boardwalk the focus of Steven Universes human world.

Characters 

During the early stages of production, Sugar worked on character appearance and personality development simultaneously; during this process of conception, she was heavily inspired by fantasy television characters she and her brother used to draw when they were younger. Lead character designer Danny Hynes, influenced by the design of Mickey Mouse by Disney artists, wanted the characters to be standardized, simple and recognizable. He proposed 24 human characters to the crew; Rebecca and Steven Sugar drew 22 designs—13 of which were made official. The coloring was done by Jones-Quartey. Rebecca Sugar merged several characters during the pilot development; supporting characters Lars and Sadie were originally created when she was in college. The Pizza family was based on Jones-Quartey's Ghanaian family, and Ronaldo was created by Ben Levin and Matt Burnett. Guy Davis, a childhood friend of the Sugars, designed the early monsters and Gem architecture.

Making a character "look alive" was always a priority in their design; according to Jones-Quartey, a character's emotions should be clearly delineated. The character design team's mission is for the characters to resemble a classic cartoon such as 1940s Disney cartoons, Dragon Ball Z or the works of Osamu Tezuka and Harvey Kurtzman. In drawing the characters for each episode, the crew has two weeks to make modifications. Character names and some designs were inspired by types of food, and some characters were redesigned because the pilot revealed discrepancies between appearances and personalities. Sugar planned for the characters' designs to receive visual benchmarks so the show's artists can draw them consistently. Sugar aimed to make the designs for her characters simple, flexible and consistent so the production team members would not become bogged down by over-complex details. This redesigning meant the appearances of the characters in the pilot episode differs substantially from their depiction in the television series.

Sugar wanted the Gems to resemble humans; she developed the Crystal Gems to ride a roller coaster of family life with Steven, whom they would treat like a brother. She wanted their gems to reflect their personalities; Pearl's perfect smoothness, Amethyst's coarseness and Garnet's air of mystery. According to Sugar, the Gems are "some version of me ... neurotic, lazy, decisive". Their facial designs were influenced by Wassily Kandinsky, who taught at the Bauhaus and encouraged his students to pair three primary colors—red, yellow and blue—with the three basic shapes—square, triangle and circle. Because of the characters' personalities, Garnet is square, Amethyst is a sphere and Pearl is a cone. Sugar wanted to give the Gems a superpower similar to those of classic cartoon characters such as Bugs Bunny. The Gems' ability to shape-shift is a reference to older cartoons such as Tex Avery's work for MGM, where characters would change at will. Although the Crystal Gems are intended to be serious characters, the writers wanted them to be "funny and weird" as well.

Production
According to Sugar, production for Steven Universe began while she was working on Adventure Time, her last episode for which was "Simon & Marcy". Working on both series simultaneously became impossible; she also encountered difficulty in the production of the episode "Bad Little Boy". Cartoon Network executives authorized the Steven Universe production crew to begin working after their pre-production presentation, for which the crew were well-prepared. The episodes "Cheeseburger Backpack" and "Together Breakfast" were developed at this time. Although Sugar works as executive producer on the series' art, animation and sound, she considers herself "the most hands on" at the storyboarding stage.

The episode outlines are passed to the storyboarders, who create the action for the episode and write its dialogue. The storyboards are animated, using paper drawings and the production crew's designs, by one of two Korean studios; Sunmin and Rough Draft and the production crew's designs.

Storyboard 

During storyboard meetings, artists draw their ideas on post-it notes, which are then attached to walls, table and boxes in the corners of their conference room. The drawings play a major role in forming episode ideas; Sugar looks at these designs and occasionally makes changes to key poses. Sugar likes to review and re-draw scenes and characters to add extra pathos and emotion to storyboards. Each episode's storyboards are created by two artists, each of whom writes half of the dialogue and draws panels similar to comic strips. This process can be quite complex; the storyboard artists must create the cinematography and focus on scenic design in a way similar to film production. After the panels are made, the thumbnail-storyboard artists draw mannerisms and dialogue based on their own experiences; Sugar draws "quintessential" scenes from her memories of hanging out with her brother after school. The storyboard artists then discuss their work with the rest of the crew and make any necessary changes. After the team discussion, the storyboard artists draw a revised board—based on the thumbnail board—on a full-size panel with notes. The storyboards are again discussed, corrected and finally approved.

Writing 
During the pilot development, Sugar wrote and sketched a number of plot ideas that later became episodes. The series' initial premise focused mostly on Steven's human side, rather than his magic side, but the premise was later changed. Sugar developed the Gems' history in conjunction with the pilot episode. While the first season of the show introduced the human and Gem characters and their relationships, Sugar began to plot and explore second-season storylines involving the Crystal Gems. Eventually, Sugar created a chart with taped printouts about a 2,000-year Gem and Earth history, with a number of events needing to be "fleshed out" for production. Although the series' overall plot is established, the writers improvise to arrive at its ending; according to Matt Burnett, the storylines will be resolved by the series' end. Sugar wanted the series to focus on comedy and positivity before exploring controversial subjects involving the main characters, thinking it was "more honest" to begin the show with happiness instead of action or drama.

The writers—formerly Levin and Burnett—would write the premises and outlines while the storyboarders wrote and drew the episodes. Everyone would wait at least a day to get together and discuss. The writers write potential episode names on paper cards, which they pin on the conference-room wall to review what they have written and plan their meetings. They discuss episode pacing and vary each season's texture by balancing "lighter" and "heavier" story arcs. Changes in major-character appearances—such as Yellow Diamond—in a storyline can be difficult for the writers. According to Ben Levin, writing a season of Steven Universe is like a "jigsaw puzzle" because the writing team must assemble a number of plot ideas, which are discarded if they do not benefit character growth. After further discussion and questions about the writing, an idea becomes an episode. After discussing a season's proposed episodes the "puzzle" is complete, and they begin writing a major story arc or a season finale. Burnett said writing a season is like an algebraic equation "where one side is the season finale, and the x's and y's are the episodes we need for that solution to make sense"; he cited "Ocean Gem", "Steven the Sword Fighter", "Monster Buddies", "An Indirect Kiss" and "Serious Steven" as examples. Those episodes led to the season-one finale as a minor story arc. To develop new ideas for episodes, the writers play writing games. In one, a scenario with characters is drawn and passed to another writer. The second writer adds a few sentences before giving it to a third, until the drawing has a three-act story. Episodes such as "Island Adventure", "Future Boy Zoltron" and "Onion Friend" were written this way. The writers also play drawing games, which design new Gem characters and technological ideas. Burnett said he and Levin use fewer ideas from the storyboarders than they previously did; storyboarders change fewer things than they did before because the episodes have a "stronger continuity".

According to Levin, he and Burnett try to balance the focus between the main characters—with Steven in the center—and the theme of episodes in their writing. The balance indicates Steven has the same interests on his human side as he does on his Gem side. Levin said the Gem mythology and drama would have been less interesting if Steven was not as well-developed in the first few episodes. Grateful to work on a show which is unafraid to be "sincere and vulnerable", he said if every episode was emotional the series would become formulaic; happy episodes balance out emotional ones. Levin said he and Burnett have found ways to integrate Steven's powers into the plot. The character's powers and home-world technology are revealed at a "measured (very slow) pace", satisfying the viewer and keeping the series clear of superhero territory.

Before significant plotlines air, the writers reveal information relevant to a "climactic" episode for the audience. According to storyboard artist Hilary Florido, much of the series' action and magic are narrative climaxes, demonstrating the characters' discoveries, difficulties and views. Florido said if a character's evolution is not directly related to the plot, there is no drama. The crew is discouraged from breaking perspective involving episode development as they want the audience to know the protagonist's point of view. Although the writers could hint at future events, they prefer to focus on plot and develop Steven in real time. Levin said if the pilot tried to present Gem history in five minutes, the audience and protagonist would be equally confused.

Backgrounds 
The production of background art begins after the approved storyboards are received. If the characters visit old locations, the pre-existing backgrounds are modified for authenticity; it is likely locations would change slightly over time. Steven Sugar likes to hide narrative bits in the backgrounds because he believes the key to world-building is "having a cohesive underlying structure to everything". Former art director Elle Michalka said the backgrounds' artistic style was inspired by French post-impressionist painter Paul Cézanne, whose apparent lack of focus belied detail and specificity. The art was also inspired by Tao Te Ching, whose work highlights the importance of empty spaces, "like the space within a vase as being part of the vase that makes it useful". During the painting phase, the painters see the lines as "descriptive bones" and color is used loosely, meaning the color is intentionally slightly off register, highlighting the distinction between color and line. The painters used "superimposed" watercolor texture before switching to Photoshop because the former made the backgrounds "very chunky". When painting the backgrounds, they use one primary and several secondary colors; Amanda Winterston and Jasmin Lai found suitable color combinations. After the primary backgrounds are painted, they are sent to the color stylist, who chooses colors for a character or prop from model sheets, matching and complementing the storyboard and background. The lines of the character or prop are rarely colored. The lines are removed when scenes need light effects. The coloring in early season-one episodes was experimental because the stylist would have difficulty if a storyboard's character and background mixed together or a bright character walked unchanged into a shadow. Mistakes became rare as the crew planned and checked storyboards. The primary backgrounds are made in Burbank; the secondary ones by Korean artists.

Animation 
After the crew finishes constructing an episode, the production team sends it to animators in Korea. The animation is produced by Sunmin Image Pictures and Rough Draft Korea. The production team and animators communicate by email and sometimes use video chat when animating a major episode. Before sending the episode to one of the studios, animation director Nick DeMayo and his team create a plan for the animators after reviewing the animatics. They then add character movements on exposure sheets to guide the animators. Mouth assignments for the characters, describing mouth shapes and timing for lip-syncing, follow. The episode is then sent to one of the animation studios. The black-and-white version is sent first, followed about two weeks later by the colored version. The animation is drawn and inked on paper, then scanned and colored digitally. The crew then arranges a "work print" meeting to discuss the episode and review it for errors. DeMayo notes any errors, removes them and sends the episode back to the animation studio or to Cartoon Network's post-production department to fix any remaining issues. Minor animation mistakes or omissions are fixed by the crew.

Voice cast 

American actor Zach Callison voices Steven. The role of Steven is his first lead role on television. For his audition, Callison spoke ten lines of dialogue from the pilot and sang the theme song while being recorded. Garnet, the Crystal Gem leader, is voiced by Estelle, a singer, songwriter and actor. Cartoon Network asked Estelle to take the part, her first voice-acting role. Steven Universe was also the first animation voice role for actor Michaela Dietz who voices Amethyst and The Party singer Deedee Magno who voices Pearl. Sugar wanted Tom Scharpling, whom she knew from his podcast The Best Show with Tom Scharpling, to voice a character for one of her projects before Steven Universe was conceived. She approached Scharpling for the part of Greg Universe, who was originally named Tom. The Ruby Gems are voiced by Charlyne Yi, to whom Sugar wrote to say she was confident Yi would be perfect for the role. Grace Rolek, who voices Steven's friend Connie, was 16 years old when the series began; Rolek has been a voice actor in animated productions since the age of five or six.

The show's four main voice actors—Callison, Dietz, Magno and Estelle—spend three to four hours recording per session; three to four weeks a month for ten months each year. Cast members record together or separately; they are often recording multiple episodes. Each recording session covers a new episode and includes retakes for that episode or previous ones if needed. In group recording sessions, a maximum of six actors stand in a semicircle. Sugar and voice director Kent Osborne attend the sessions, advising the actors about voicing the characters in specific situations. If they like a take, the production assistant marks it and gives it to the animation editor for the episode's rough cut. When a recording session begins, Sugar explains the storyboards and describes the sequences, character intention and the relationship between them; Osborne does the recording. Before the sessions, Sugar and the voice actors discuss new plot elements and shows them the advanced storyboards. Magno said she enjoys the group recording sessions because the funny faces the cast members make while recording lines requiring emotion or movement often cause them to laugh.

Music
Steven Universe features songs and musical numbers produced by Sugar and her writers, who collaborate on each song's lyrics. Multiple drafts of the theme song's lyrics were written. Sugar composed the extended theme song while waiting in line for a security check at Los Angeles International Airport. The series relies on leitmotifs for its soundtrack; instruments, genres and melodies are allotted to specific characters. The music is influenced by the works of Michael Jackson and Estelle; and Sugar has cited Aimee Mann as "a huge influence". Sugar writes songs for the series during her travels, accompanying herself on a ukulele. Not every episode features a song; according to Sugar, she uses them occasionally, to avoid forced creativity.

Most of the show's incidental music is composed by the chiptune piano duo Aivi & Surasshu, with guitars by Stemage. Jeff Liu, who was familiar with producer Aivi's musical score for the video game Cryamore, recommended them to Sugar as a composer. Sugar asked Aivi to audition and agreed that producer Surasshu could join them.  Aivi & Surasshu scored a clip from "Gem Glow", the series' first episode; Sugar liked their work and hired them as series composers. Before composing an episode, Aivi & Surasshu video chat with Sugar and the creative director to discuss the episode; they have a week to send Sugar a preview score. After any necessary changes, Aivi & Surasshu send the score to Sabre Media Studios for the final mix with their sound designs.

Each character has a leitmotif expressing their personality, which changes slightly depending on the situation. Pearl is often accompanied by a piano, Garnet by a synth bass, Amethyst by a drum machine with electric bass and synths, and Steven with chiptune tones. Sound palettes were produced for the human characters to represent the evolution of the series, its characters and their relationships. Sound motifs and palettes were also created for locations, objects and abstract concepts. When Sugar or the other writers write a song for an episode, they record a demo that is sent to the composers. The same musical style for a song and the character singing it is used for each song. Over time, the songs have become increasingly complex and production has become more difficult because the show's original musical style no longer fits perfectly with the newer lyrical themes. An example is "Here Comes a Thought", sung by Estelle and AJ Michalka (who voices Stevonnie). The two were less inspired by a specific musical style, but rather by the song's "feel", which Sugar had explained to them.

Broadcast
The pilot episode of Steven Universe was released on Cartoon Network's video platform on May 21, 2013, and an edited version was released on July 20. The pilot was shown at the 2013 San Diego Comic-Con, and Sugar hosted a 30-minute panel discussion about the series at the 2013 New York Comic Con on October 13. Initially, thirteen half-hours (26 episodes) were ordered for the first season; on November 14, the season was picked up for an additional thirteen half-hours. The series was renewed for a second season of 26 half-hours on July 25, 2014, which began airing on March 13, 2015, and for a third season of 26 half-hours in July 2015. In March 2016, a production shuffle saw the second and third seasons subdivided to create four seasons of 13 half-hours each, making a total of five seasons. Finally, in 2016, following the decision to end the series, Sugar petitioned Cartoon Network to extend the fifth season by three extra half-hours to wrap up the story, making it 16 half-hours total.

The series premiered in the United States on November 4, 2013, on Cartoon Network with two episodes. In Canada, it began airing on Cartoon Network on November 11, 2013, and on Teletoon on April 24, 2014. It began airing on Cartoon Network channels in Australia on February 3, 2014, and in the United Kingdom and Ireland on May 12 of that year.

Beginning in 2015, Cartoon Network often aired new episodes in groups of five over one week—marketed as "Stevenbombs"—rather than one episode per week. The hiatuses between groups have irritated fans, according to The A.V. Club causing "agonized cries of a rabid, starving, pained cult following". The format, which is also used for other Cartoon Network series, has, in the website's view, contributed to the network's spikes in Google Trends associated with each "bomb". The A.V. Club attributed the effect to Steven Universes unusual—for a youth cartoon—adherence to an overarching plot, which can generate "massive swells of online interest"—similar to the release of full seasons of adult TV series—which are "crucial to a network's vitality in an increasingly internet-based television world".

In May 2018, Cartoon Network apologized to fans after one of the channel's promotional videos contained unaired footage with significant spoilers for future episodes. In response to the video, former series producer Ian Jones-Quartey noted in a later-deleted tweet that "being a Steven Universe fan is suffering", alluding to the series' irregular and unpredictable airing schedule. In an October 2020 art book for the series, Sugar stated that when clips from unaired episodes, giving away major spoilers, were leaked or those clips were used in official promotional videos, it was "very demoralizing for the crew."

From June 2, 2018 to July 29, 2018, Steven Universe aired re-runs on Cartoon Network's sister channel, Boomerang.

Episodes

Crossovers
"Say Uncle" is a crossover episode with Uncle Grandpa that aired on April 2, 2015. In the episode, Uncle Grandpa helps Steven use his Gem powers when he cannot summon his shield. The episode contains an acknowledgement by Uncle Grandpa that the episode is not canonical. Steven, Garnet, Amethyst, Pearl and other Cartoon Network characters from current and former shows made cameo appearances in the Uncle Grandpa episode "Pizza Eve".

Additionally, Garnet appeared in "Crossover Nexus", an episode of OK K.O.! Let's Be Heroes, which aired on October 8, 2018. In the episode, Garnet teamed up with K.O., Ben Tennyson from Ben 10 and Raven from Teen Titans Go! to stop the villain Strike.

Minisodes

Two volumes of mini-episodes have been released by Cartoon Network. The first one includes the extended title theme "We Are the Crystal Gems"; shorts in which the Crystal Gems teach Steven about Gems in a classroom setting; an unboxing video of Steven's new duffel bag; and a short in which Steven's pet lion is playing with a cardboard box. The second volume contains fives minisodes that show Steven cooking, performing karaoke, reacting to "Crying Breakfast Friends!", video chatting with Lapis and Peridot, and playing a new song.

Cancellation and sequels 

According to Rebecca Sugar, she was notified in 2016 that the series would be cancelled at the end of the fifth season. She prevailed upon Cartoon Network to extend the fifth season to 32 episodes, in order to have room to complete the story, as well as a follow-up television film, Steven Universe: The Movie. Along with the film, Cartoon Network also greenlighted an additional season of 20 episodes, which would become the sequel series Steven Universe Future, taking place after the events of the film. Despite the show's end, Sugar has indicated that more stories could exist, but has stated that she needs a long break before deciding how to approach such a continuation.

Film 

The follow-up TV film, Steven Universe: The Movie, was announced on July 21, 2018, at San Diego Comic-Con. A teaser was shown and was uploaded to the Cartoon Network YouTube channel. It was released on Cartoon Network commercial-free on September 2, 2019. The 82-minute film takes place two years after the events of the series finale; its plot centers on a deranged Gem, Spinel, erasing the Crystal Gems' memories to take revenge for her abandonment by Steven's mother.

Sequel limited series 

The limited series Steven Universe Future, intended to serve as an epilogue to the main series, was announced at the 2019 New York Comic Con. Steven Universe Future premiered on December 7, 2019 and ran for a total of 20 11-minute episodes, including a four-part finale airing on March 27, 2020. Its narrative focuses on Steven dealing with his own emotional trauma in the aftermath of the events of the series.

Other media

Books
A number of companion books have been published:
 Steven Universe's Guide to the Crystal Gems (October 2015) by series creator Rebecca Sugar, with information about the Crystal Gems.
 Quest for Gem Magic (October 2015) by Max Brallier is a "colorful journal and activity book" for 8- to 12-year-olds.
 Steven Universe Mad Libs (October 2015) by Walter Burns is a Mad Libs word-game book.
 Steven Universe: Live from Beach City (February 2016) is a music and activity book with chord charts and sheet music for the first season's major songs.
 What in the Universe? (February 2016) by Jake Black is a collection of trivia about Steven and the Gems.
 Best Buds Together Fun (June 2016) by Jake Black is a "quiz and activity book" for at 8- to 12-year-olds.
 The Answer (September 2016) by Rebecca Sugar is a children's-book adaptation of the episode, "The Answer". It was seventh on The New York Times Best Seller list on October 2, 2016.
 The Tale of Steven (October 2019) by Rebecca Sugar is a children's book companion to the episode "Change Your Mind". Inspired by Sugar's experience of coming out, it retells Pink Diamond's decision to become Rose Quartz and to create Steven from the perspectives of White Diamond, Rose and Steven himself, each readable by rotating the pages of the book in different directions.

Nonfiction books covering the development of the franchise and compiling production artwork have also been published:
 Steven Universe: Art and Origins (July 2017, Abrams Books) by Chris McDonnell, with an introduction by Dexter's Laboratory creator Genndy Tartakovsky and a foreword by Rebecca Sugar. The book contains concept art, production samples, early sketches, storyboards and commentary by the Steven Universe production crew.
 The Art of Steven Universe The Movie (March 2020, Dark Horse) by Ryan Sands, which contains preliminary character designs and storyboards.
 Steven Universe: End of an Era (October 2020, Abrams Books) by Chris McDonnell, with a foreword by N. K. Jemisin.

Video games
The tactical role-playing video game Steven Universe: Attack the Light! was released on April 2, 2015, for iOS and Android devices. It was developed by Grumpyface Studios in collaboration with Sugar for mobile devices. Players control Steven and three Crystal Gems to fight light monsters. A sequel, Steven Universe: Save the Light, was released for consoles in October 2017. Another sequel, Steven Universe: Unleash the Light, was released exclusively on Apple Arcade in November 2019. It was then rereleased on PC (Steam) and consoles in February 2021.

A rhythm-based mobile game, Steven Universe: Soundtrack Attack, was released on July 21, 2016, in the United States. A player-created Gem flees her pursuer through side-scrolling stages set to remixes of the series' music. Another mobile game, Steven Universe: Dreamland Arcade, was released in 2017; it is a collection of arcade games with characters from the series.

Steven Universe characters appear in Cartoon Network's kart racing game Formula Cartoon All-Stars and in the side-scrolling, beat-'em-up game Battle Crashers. In common with other Cartoon Network series, several browser-based games—including Heap of Trouble, Goat Guardian and Gem Bound—are available on the channel's website.

On February 26, 2019, Minecraft released a Mash-Up Pack based on Steven Universe, making it the second Cartoon Network series to receive one after Adventure Time.

On December 4, 2019, Brawlhalla, a free-to-play fighting game, added Steven Universe characters.

Comics
BOOM! Studios has published several limited comics series based on Steven Universe:

 A monthly comic series, written by Jeremy Sorese and illustrated by Coleman Engle, was first published in August 2014. It ended in March 2015.
 A graphic novel, the first in a planned series, was published by KaBOOM! on April 6, 2016. Also written by Sorese, drawn by Asia Kendrick Holton, and illustrated by Rosemary Valero-O'Connell, and based on a story by Ian Jones-Quartey, Too Cool for School is about Steven accompanying Connie to school.
 A four-part comic miniseries titled Steven Universe and the Crystal Gems was published in 2016. It is written by Josecline Fenton and illustrated by Chrystin Garland, and the covers are illustrated by Kat Leyh. 
 A reboot comic series written by Melanie Gillman and illustrated by Katy Farina began publication in January 2017.  It has also been written by Grace Kraft, and illustrated by Rii Abrego, Meg Omac, and Kat Hayashida. Since Issue 9 to Issue 12 and Issue 13 to onwards it is written by Kraft and illustrated by Abrego.
 A second graphic novel called Anti-Gravity was released in July 2017. It is written by Talya Perper and illustrated by Queenie Chan.
 A five-issue miniseries called Steven Universe: Harmony was first released in August 2018. It is written by Shane Michael Vidaurri and illustrated by Mollie Rose. The covers are illustrated by Marguerite Sauvage.

Toys and merchandise
In October 2015, Cartoon Network announced a line of toys based on Steven Universe, which would be sold by specialty retailers. For the 2015 holiday season, Funko made "Pop!" vinyl figures and Just Toys offered "blind bag" novelty products. PhatMojo sold plush figures and foam weapons, and Zag Toys released collectible bobbleheads and other mini-figures in early 2016. The following year, Toy Factory planned to sell a line of plush and novelty items. Cartoon Network sells a variety of products, including mugs, blankets and clothing, based on the show's episodes and characters.

Soundtracks 

The first soundtrack album collecting songs from the first four seasons, Steven Universe Soundtrack: Volume 1, was released on June 2, 2017. The soundtrack debuted at number 22 on the Billboard 200, number two on the Soundtracks chart, and number one on the Independent Albums chart. In Europe, it reached number 28 on the UK Album Downloads Chart, nine on the country's Soundtrack chart, 56 on the nation's official Compilation chart, and 174 on the Ultratop Flanders album chart. An album of songs from the fifth and final season, Steven Universe: Volume 2 (Original Soundtrack) as well as a karaoke album were released on April 12, 2019. Volume 2 debuted at number 24 on the Soundtracks chart, number 28 on the Independent Albums chart, and number 14 on the Kid Albums chart. A soundtrack for the movie featuring its songs and score was released on September 3, 2019, peaking at number 57 on the Billboard 200, number five on the soundtrack chart, number six on the Independent chart, and number two on the Kid Albums chart. The soundtrack for Steven Universe Future was released on October 23, 2020.

Five albums featuring the show's score were released on May 29, June 26, July 31, August 28, and September 25, 2020, respectively.

Reception

Critical response
Steven Universe has been widely praised for its art, music, voice performances, storytelling and characterization. According to James Whitbrook of io9, it is an "equally rewarding watch" for adults and children, and Eric Thurm of Wired has called it "one of the stealthiest, smartest, and most beautiful things on the air". Over the course of its run, Steven Universe has attracted a rapidly-growing fan base. In 2019, TV Guide ranked Steven Universe #61 in its selection of the top 100 contemporary television series, describing the series as "groundbreaking" with an "uplifting, self-affirming message".

Critics have praised the "breathtaking beauty", "intriguing, immersive environments" and "loveably goofy aesthetic" of Steven Universes art, writing highly of its distinctive, soft pastel backgrounds and its "gorgeous, expressive, clean animation". Reviewers also enjoyed the diverse, ensemble cast's voice acting, particularly that of Tom Scharpling's Greg, Zach Callison's "exuberant and expressive" work as Steven and Grace Rolek "singing her heart out" as Connie.

All five seasons of Steven Universe hold a perfect 100% rating on Rotten Tomatoes. The website's critical consensus for season five reads "Having blossomed into a sophisticated mythology with a deeply moving subtext, Steven Universe remains a sparkling entertainment and perfect introduction to LGBTQ representation for children."

Style and themes
Sugar wanted Steven Universe to be thematically consistent with hers and her brother's shared interests. As a coming-of-age series, the theme of family is important since Sugar based the titular character on her brother. Additionally, the theme of love was inspired by her relationship with Jones-Quartey. The series also expresses the importance of acceptance, and explores relationships, LGBT identity, body shapes and "hues of skin in a colorful sci-fi magic display of diversity". According to Kat Morris, the series' central concepts are developed over time in an organic way, rather than being "overly calculated" from the start. Former writer Matt Burnett said the series' simple-life theme prevented the inclusion of "cynicism" or "snarkiness". According to Burnett, the writers have no interest in a superhero theme.

The unusually strong female presence in a series about a boy—all major characters except Steven and Greg are female—is intentional according to Sugar, who intended to "tear down and play with the semiotics of gender in cartoons for children", considering it "absurd" that shows for boys should be fundamentally different from those for girls. She developed the series' plot towards a distant goal, with everything in between kept flexible, partly because her intentions have "changed since I've started because I've grown up a lot" while working on the show. Sugar described the series as "reverse escapism": the idea that fantasy characters would become interested in real life and would want to participate in it. Steven personifies the "love affair between fantasy and reality". Sugar said Steven Universe was influenced by the anime series Future Boy Conan, Revolutionary Girl Utena and The Simpsons. 
Steven Universe, according to Eric Thurm, is a low-key, slice of life portrayal of childhood, an examination of unconventional family dynamics, a homage to anime, video games and other pop-culture mainstays, and a "straightforward kids' show about superheroes". Jacob Hope Chapman of Anime News Network said the anime series Revolutionary Girl Utena and Sailor Moon are Steven Universes strongest influences visually and structurally, reflected by its "predominantly playful tone, interrupted by crushing drama at key moments", and its "glorification of the strengths of femininity, dilution of gender barriers, and emphasis on a wide variety of relationships between women, aimed at a family audience". Steven Universe also refers to Japanese cultural icons, including Neon Genesis Evangelion, Akira, Cowboy Bebop, Dragon Ball Z, Studio Ghibli movies and Junji Ito's horror manga The Enigma of Amigara Fault.

According to Whitbrook, the series' "masterful sense of pace" allows it to integrate foreshadowing and worldbuilding into scenes, which makes an overarching, dramatic narrative emerge from what might otherwise be "monster of the week" episodes. The narration of a complex story from a child's perspective means its exposition remains "artfully restrained, growing in ambition with the series" and Steven's character. Steven Universes measured pace allows its characters to become "more complex and interesting than most of their counterparts on prestige dramas", developing "as real people and not entities serving narrative functions". The series explores increasingly-challenging facets of relationships, such as the possibility Pearl may partially resent Steven because he is the reason his mother Rose no longer exists, and the growing self-destruction of Pearl's "all-consuming passion" for Rose. Its action scenes—such as Estelle's song presenting the climactic fight in "Jail Break" as a contest between Garnet's loving relationship and Jasper's lone-wolf attitude—are occasionally cast as philosophical arguments.

Characters

Adams highlighted the "groundbreaking and inventive" portrayal of the complicated "mentor/caregiver/older sibling dynamic" between Steven and the Crystal Gems in a series which, at its core, is about sibling relationships. Thurm wrote that a notable emotional difference between Steven Universe, and Adventure Time and Regular Show, is that the latter two series deal with their protagonists' transitions to adulthood whereas during its first season, Steven Universe was content to be "enamored with the simplicity of childhood". Steven slowly grows from being an obnoxious, tag-along child to an accepted member of the Crystal Gems in his own right by the end of the first season, a change brought about by increased insight and experience rather than age. Joe Cain noted in The Mary Sue that unlike heroes from antiquity (Hercules) and modern fiction (Luke Skywalker), Steven is defined by his mother's legacy rather than his father's; the preponderance of mother figures in the series underscores their rarity in other fiction. According to Kat Smalley of PopMatters, the Gems' alien nature, which prevents them from fully understanding the world they protect, is handled with "remarkable depth and intellectual rigor", even as they deal with human issues such as "depression, post-traumatic stress, and self-loathing" remaining from the long-past war for Earth.

Smalley characterized Steven Universe as part of a growing trend of cartoons that appeal to adults and children alike, which includes Avatar: The Last Airbender (2005), its sequel The Legend of Korra (2012), Adventure Time (2010) and Regular Show (2010). This is reflected in the series' outreach to minorities that seldom appear elsewhere in animation and its broader themes: instead of delivering genre-typical, mustache-twirling villains, Steven Universe "deals with issues of extraordinary violence and horror, depicts its characters in shades of grey, and subtly plays with matters of philosophy, morality, and interpersonal conflicts, all while refusing to reset any development to a status quo".

Gender and sexuality

"Gender is at the forefront of the conversation surrounding Steven Universe", according to Erik Adams of the A.V. Club, who noted that "the show's superheroes are all women". As a self-aware pastiche of magical girl anime, the series subverts the genre's premises by having Steven embody the loving femininity of the typical magical-girl protagonist without ridicule or losing his masculine side. Whitbrook characterized the series as being "about love—all kinds of love", including non-traditional forms such as the motherly and friendly bond between Steven and the Gems, and Garnet as the "physical embodiment of a lesbian relationship".

When placing the series on the honor list of the 2015 Tiptree Award, which recognizes works of science fiction or fantasy that explore and expand gender roles, the jury wrote: "In the context of children's television, this show deals with gender in a much more open and mature way than is typical for the genre, and has some of the best writing of any cartoon ... In addition to showing men and women who do not necessarily conform to standard American gender ideals, the show also gives us an agender/non-binary character and a thoughtful exploration of growing up".

In 2015, Autostraddle's Mey Rude wrote that Steven Universe was the most-recent animated series for a younger audience with significant queer themes, such as the  androgynous fusion Stevonnie and the romantic relationship between the Gems Ruby and Sapphire, whose fusion is the main character Garnet. This, according to Rude, reflects the growing prominence of these themes in children's cartoons; previous depictions were subtextual or minimal, such as the 2011 Adventure Time episode "What Was Missing", the 2014 series Clarence or (more explicit but unexplored) the 2014 finale of Nickelodeon's The Legend of Korra. In Steven Universe, LGBT themes are prominent as early as the first season's second half. The fifth season's engagement and wedding between Ruby and Sapphire was reportedly the first same-sex marriage proposal in a children's animated series. In their 2015 report, GLAAD stated that the show reflected the "diversity of the real world," noting that one of the show's protagonists, Garnet, is "the physical form of two female-presenting Gem beings who are in love", shown in episodes such as "The Answer", focusing on how the romantic relationship between Ruby and Sapphire. This led some to say the show has "heavy queer undertones." "The Answer" later earned the show its second Emmy nomination, one of the six for the show.

Stevonnie, a fusion between Steven and Connie debuted in the January 15th episode Alone Together, using they/them pronouns. Sugar, the show creator, said that Stevonnie challenges gender norms as a "metaphor for all the terrifying firsts in a first relationship." Later, the show earned a Emmy nomination in 2018 for the episode "Jungle Moon" centered around Stevonnie, a non-binary character. 

According to Sugar, her series' LGBT representation is not intended to make a point but to help children understand themselves and develop their identities. In her view, queer youth deserve to see themselves in stories as much as other children—and, given pervasive heteronormativity, not allowing them to do so can be harmful. She said, "I think a lot about fairy tales and Disney movies and the way that love is something that's always discussed with children. You're told that you should dream about love, about this fulfilling love that you're going to have. [...] Why shouldn't everyone have that?" During a 2016 panel discussion, Sugar said the LGBT themes in Steven Universe were also largely based on her own experience as a bisexual woman. A year later she said that Fluorite—the fusion of six Gems introduced in the season five episode "Off Colors"—represents a polyamorous relationship. In July 2018, she told an interviewer that she created the series' Gems as "non-binary women" in order to express herself, as a non-binary woman, through them.

The series' reputation as "one of the most unabashedly queer shows on TV" generated controversy in 2016 when Cartoon Network UK removed an embrace between Rose and Pearl but did not remove a kiss between Rose and Greg from its British broadcast. The network, which said the decision was intended to make the episode "more comfortable for local kids and their parents", was criticized as homophobic by fans and the media. In 2017, the Kenya Film Classification Board banned Steven Universe and other cartoon series from being broadcast for "glorifying homosexual behavior".

Sugar told Vanity Fair in March 2021 that she had been determined to make "queer couples and narratives" integral to the story in ways that are "impossible to censor," and had to fight internally for the representation. Obstacles from Cartoon Network executives included requests to make Ruby a boy, have the characters never kiss on the mouth, and not have a romantic relationship between Ruby and Sapphire, and warnings that if anyone on the crew, including Sugar herself, publicly "confirmed that the characters were LGBTQIA+, it might lead to the show’s cancellation." Sugar said that she began to talk publicly about why she "felt so strongly that kids deserve these stories" and won with the "support of Steven Universe’s young fans and the muscle of GLAAD behind them."

In June 2021, Taneka Stotts, a genderfluid writer for Steven Universe: Future told Insider that Sugar "went out of the way to make sure that their show was [staffed] as inclusive as possible", hiring talented people noticed on Tumblr and Twitter instead of industry regulars. Sugar said that being at the forefront of LGBTQ representation meant that beyond what they were creating there was "very little queer content". She also said that apart from threats and backlash from homophobic viewers, she feared that her identity and content in the show could lead to its cancellation if she spoke about it openly, noting that support for the show was "often very qualified and hurtful". She also noted that non-binary creators such as herself have additional challenges, going through a world were non-binary people are dehumanized, and hoped that "visible queer content and multiple queer creators means no one has to feel isolated" in the ways that she did. The same month, Sugar told NPR that she wanted "little boys to experience girl show things" and vice versa, and for "nonbinary, gender-expansive kids to have a show".

In September 2021, Abbey White, a non-binary reporter for Insider and The Hollywood Reporter, told The Hollywood Reporter's "Hollywood Remixed" podcast that the whole idea behind the show is "an upending of gender expectation," with Steven as a "gender nonconforming boy" with a family of "feminine non-binary, non-gendered aliens," saying this is "laced in very conscious, purposeful ways throughout the entire series." Previously, Mashable had stated that some fans relate to Lars Barriga in certain respects to the transgender experience, like feelings of societal pressure and conformity, even though he is not a confirmed transgender character. The series also featured Fluorite, a representation of a polyamorous relationship, a minor show character, and Kiki Pizza, who asked Stevonnie on a date in the comics. Additionally, a Steven Universe storyboarder stated in 2017 that Harold Smiley and Quentin Frowney were a gay couple. This was also confirmed by the official artbook released the same year, titled Steven Universe: Art & Origins, which showed that episode concept art for "Future Boy Zoltron"

Music 
Aivi Tran and Steven "Surasshu" Velema's chiptune-inspired music has also been praised in reviews: Oliver Sava of The A.V. Club mentioned its range from "peppy retro" to Ghibli-esque "smooth jazz piano", Eric Thurm wrote that the musical numbers are characterized by "uplifting determination", and James Whitbrook wrote that they have evolved from being "little ... goofy ditties" to an integral part of the show's storytelling. Thurm wrote for Pitchfork that "music matters in Rebecca Sugar's work", more than in most musicals, by structuring the characters' lives rather than merely telling a story.

The series' music has also been widely praised. "Stronger Than You" has been referred to as a "queer fight song", and the end credits song, "Love Like You", has also been called worthy of being "the latest addition to the Great American Songbook".

Fandom

 
Public interest in the series measured by Google Trends vastly outstripped that of Cartoon Network's other series in April 2016, which The A.V. Club called "definitive proof that Steven Universe is now Cartoon Network's flagship series".

Fans have campaigned against censorship outside the United States of the series' representation of LGBT relationships. A fan campaign persuaded Cartoon Network's French subsidiary to re-record the song "Stronger than You" with a translation making the singer's love as explicit as the original, and another was launched in 2016 to protest Cartoon Network's British subsidiary's practice of removing scenes of affection between Gems from UK broadcasts. Swedish fans originated a protest petition after flirting between Gems was changed to unrelated dialogue in the Swedish broadcast of the episode, "Hit the Diamond".

According to io9, "while most of the Steven Universe fandom is supportive and welcoming, there is a small subsection that's known for being extreme and hostile under the guise of inclusiveness". A fan artist attempted suicide in 2015 after she was bullied on social media because of the body proportions in her art, and in 2016 storyboard artist and writer Jesse Zuke quit Twitter after being harassed by fans over perceived support for a particular romantic relationship between characters.

A full-length fan-made episode titled "The Smothering", set in an alternate version of the story's continuity, was called "one of the more impressive pieces of work to come out of the Steven Universe fandom" in 2017 by io9. Beach City Con, a Steven Universe fan convention, was held in Virginia Beach on October 13–15, 2017.

Influence and legacy
In 2019, Ian Jones-Quartey, who left the show in 2015 to develop his own show (OK K.O.! Let's Be Heroes), noted how the focus of Steven Universe on identity struck a chord with audiences, while ND Stevenson, showrunner of She-Ra and the Princesses of Power, described the show's effect on LGBTQ+ representation in Western animation, arguing that it changed the "landscape of animated shows when it first hit the air." In a later interview, Stevenson said their early conversations about queer relationships and characters in their own show were only possible because of Steven Universe. Additionally, in an interview with GLAAD's Raina Deerwater, Stevenson talked about queer representation in animation, citing Steven Universe alongside The Legend of Korra as an inspiring example of show that taught young fans to expect "nothing less than a variety of solid queer representation and central queer characters." Tracy Brown, a reviewer for the Los Angeles Times argued that the show, during its run, became the "gold standard" for Cartoon Network itself.

On January 10, 2021, Twitter user @camrynieroway tweeted that there was "absolutely nothing better than living outside the gender binary," stated they were non-binary, and added a GIF of Stevonnie, stating "‘Are you a boy or a girl?’ I’m an experience." The same day, the tweet was quoted by singer and songwriter Janelle Monáe who added the hashtag #IAmNonbinary. In an interview with The Cut a month after the tweet, she told the interviewer that she retweeted the GIF because it "resonated with me, especially as someone who has pushed boundaries of gender since the beginning of my career".

In June 2021, a former Cartoon Network executive, Katie Krentz, said part of a shift more inclusion in animation, might be due, in part, to events at conventions, giving the example of rooms at Comic-Con filled up with Steven Universe fans in their 20s, 30s, and 40s. Krentz further argued this sort of participation by fans gives executives and creators feedback on who is watching the show and will buy merchandise, and on a related note, what counts as "good" representation. Journalists for Insider also argued that the show was "the start of a wave of animated shows with LGBTQ representation."

In July 2021, Jade King of TheGamer reported that She-Ra and the Princesses of Power "wouldn't exist without Steven Universe", noting a story told by Molly Ostertag who said that her partner, ND Stevenson, used Steven Universe to prove to Netflix that shows with queer representation "have value, audiences, and a right to exist to show young people that being different is nothing to be ashamed of."

In October 2021, Matt Braly, the creator of Amphibia said he was a big fan of the show, a friend of Rebecca Sugar, and said that Sugar shows that original cartoon music can be beautiful and soulful. He also argued that there are a lot of crossover themes between Steven Universe and Amphibia, noting that a few crew members had worked on the show, and adding "we've got some Steven DNA."

In November 2021, an interviewer for GQ asked rapper and singer Lil Nas X if he watched the series, saying one of his outfits looks like Yellow Diamond in the series. Lil Nas X responded, telling the interviewer that he was going to commission someone to take the outfits of the diamonds and "position them as the diamonds."

Awards and nominations

References

Footnotes

Bibliography

External links
 
 
 

Steven Universe
2010s American animated television series
2010s American comedy-drama television series
2010s American LGBT-related animated television series
2010s American LGBT-related comedy television series
2010s American LGBT-related drama television series
2010s American comic science fiction television series
2013 American television series debuts
2019 American television series endings
American children's animated action television series
American children's animated comic science fiction television series
American children's animated drama television series
American children's animated musical television series
American children's animated science fantasy television series
Animation controversies in television
Anime-influenced Western animated television series
Boom! Studios titles
English-language television shows
Television series by Cartoon Network Studios
Coming-of-age television shows
Lesbian-related television shows
Peabody Award-winning television programs
Television series about alien visitations
Television series about ancient astronauts
Television shows set in Delaware
LGBT speculative fiction television series
LGBT-related controversies in animation
LGBT-related controversies in television
LGBT-related controversies in the United Kingdom
Teen animated television series